Season 1995–96 was the 112th football season in which Dumbarton competed at a Scottish national level, entering the Scottish Football League for the 90th time, the Scottish Cup for the 101st time, the Scottish League Cup for the 49th time and the Scottish Challenge Cup for the sixth time.

Overview 
After the success of the previous season, no one could foresee the disaster that was to befall Dumbarton. The league season had begun brightly, with the club sitting atop Division 1 with 2 wins from 2.  However manager Murdo MacLeod then departed for Premier Division Partick Thistle, and it all began to fall apart. A reluctant Jim Fallon stepped up from his assistant managerial post to take on the reins but it was clear from the start that he was ill-prepared for what was to be faced.  Indeed, the only other win to be registered throughout the remainder of the league campaign was an impressive victory over champions elect Dundee United.  From December, a string of 19 consecutive defeats in the league were suffered, Dumbarton's worst losing streak in their long history.  Relegation back to Division 2 was a certainty long before the season had ended.

In the national cup competitions, it was now four seasons without a single win.  In the Scottish Cup Airdrie defeated Dumbarton in the second round.

In the League Cup, Premier Division Kilmarnock were victors over Dumbarton, but only after extra time.

Finally, the long wait for a win in the Challenge Cup continued - a first round defeat to Brechin City was the sixth in a row.

Locally, there was something to cheer as the Stirlingshire Cup returned to Boghead, with a final win over East Stirlingshire.

Results & fixtures

Scottish First Division

Coca-Cola League Cup

Scottish League Challenge Cup

Tennant's Scottish Cup

Stirlingshire Cup

Pre-season/Other Matches

League table

Player statistics

Squad 

|}

Transfers

Players in

Players out

Reserve Team
Dumbarton competed in the Scottish Reserve League (West), and with 4 wins and 3 draws from 22 games, finished 12th and last.

Trivia
 The League match against Clydebank on 30 September marked Martin Melvin's 200th appearance for Dumbarton in all national competitions - the 23rd Dumbarton player to break the 'double century'.
 The League match against Hamilton on 16 December marked Jim Meechan's 200th appearance for Dumbarton in all national competitions - the 24rd Dumbarton player to break the 'double century'.
 The League match against St Mirren on 9 December marked Martin McGarvey's 100th appearance for Dumbarton in all national competitions - the 109th Dumbarton player to reach this milestone.
 The season ended with a two unwanted records being broken. In addition to the longest losing streak in the league - which extended to a 20-game drought once the Scottish Cup defeat is taken into account - the number of games without a win was also broken.  From 14 October, there were 28 consecutive winless games in the league - and 29 consecutive competitive games during the season.
 The two home wins recorded in the league during the season matched the record fewest league home wins last seen during the 1896-97 season.  In addition, the 15 home defeats in the league was a new record, easily beating the previous worst of 11 during the 1920-21 season.
 The 10 goals scored at Boghead in league matches beat the previous fewest home league goals (16) set in the 1918-19 season.

See also
 1995–96 in Scottish football

References

External links
Peter Dennison (Dumbarton Football Club Historical Archive)
Joe Goldie (Dumbarton Football Club Historical Archive)
Stephen Dallas (Dumbarton Football Club Historical Archive)
Alan Granger (Dumbarton Football Club Historical Archive)
Scottish Football Historical Archive

Dumbarton F.C. seasons
Scottish football clubs 1995–96 season